This list contains the locomotives and railbuses of the Royal Saxon State Railways (Königlich Saxon Staatseisenbahnen) and the locomotives of the Leipzig–Dresden Railway Company.

Leipzig-Dresden Railway 

The Leipzig–Dresden Railway Company (Leipzig-Dresdner Eisenbahn or LDE) started up its operations between 1837 and 1839, successively opening its sections of line, and was therefore the first German long distance railway. It remained independent for nearly three decades and was only absorbed into the Royal Saxon State Railways on 1 June 1876.

The LDE locomotives were only classified by name.

Royal Saxon State Railways

Description of the Locomotives 
Initially all locomotives were classified by name as was common practice. This was usual on all engines up to 1892. From 1893 to 1900 only passenger and express train locomotives still carried name plates. Thereafter name plates on all locomotives, apart from old shunting and branch line engines, were removed.

Specific groups of names were supposed to be allocated to the different classes (e.g. rivers, alpine peaks, American cities).

In addition to their names the locomotives were given 'list numbers' (Listennummern or Bahnnummern) that were also displayed on the engines from 1869 onwards. A new numbering scheme was introduced in 1892, which attempted to bring in some sort of orderly system. However it was not successful.

Because this system was confusing and impractical with the ever-rising quantity of locomotives, in 1869 a system of distinguishing between the individual classes was introduced in 1869. This system was based on an abbreviation of the manufacturer's name and a Roman numeral for each type of locomotive.

Only two years later this system was changed and the numbers were used to classify engines based on specific wheel arrangements, the manufacturer's abbreviations being retained. In addition the letters "a" (for alt = 'old') and "b" (for neu = 'new') were added.

Later on, there were further changes to the classification system. Letters were introduced to indicate locomotive classes as follows:

 F for Fairlie locomotives (from 1885)
 M for Meyer locomotives (from 1889)
 Kl for Klose locomotives (from 1889)

and as supplementary information (after the class number):

 T for tank locomotives (from 1876)
 K for 750-mm narrow gauge locomotives (sometimes also in front of the class number)
 S for Sekundärbahn locomotives (from 1884)
 O for omnibus train locomotives (from 1885)
 C for compound (Verbund) locomotives (from 1887), replaced by...
  for compound locomotives (from 1889)
 M for metre gauge locomotives
  for superheated locomotives.

In 1885 the supplementary letter "b" was given the meaning 'movable carrying axle'. The last major reorganisation of the classification system took place in 1896. The manufacturer's name was dropped. New classes of express train and goods train locomotives were given even class numbers and goods train, branch line and shunting locomotives were given odd numbers. Narrow gauge locomotives were given new class designations beginning with I. Locomotives of the same class however with different driving wheel diameters were given the additional number 1 (express train locomotives) and 2 (passenger train locomotives).

Steam locomotives

Early locomotives for all types of train

Passenger and express train locomotives

Mixed traffic locomotives

Goods train locomotives

Tank locomotives

Narrow gauge locomotives

Metre gauge

750 mm gauge

Fireless locomotive

Railbuses and electric locomotives

See also 
History of rail transport in Germany
Länderbahnen
Kingdom of Saxony
Royal Saxon State Railways
UIC classification

References

 
 
 

Transport in Saxony
Defunct railway companies of Germany
Locomotives of Germany

Deutsche Reichsbahn-Gesellschaft locomotives
Saxony-related lists
Saxony
German railway-related lists